The 2019 Mid-Season Invitational was the fifth Mid-Season Invitational (MSI), a Riot Games-organised tournament for League of Legends, the multiplayer online battle arena video game. The tournament was the culmination of the 2019 Spring Split, the first part of season 9 of the game's competitive scene.

Each of the 13 premier League of Legends leagues sent a team to represent them; Europe (LEC), South Korea (LCK) and China (LPL) had their teams automatically admitted into the main event whereas the other 10 leagues competed among each other in the Play-in Stage, with the top three teams advancing to join the main event Group Stage.

"Bring Home The Glory" was the tournament's theme song, put together by Sara Skinner.

The tournament was hosted in Vietnam and Taiwan from 1 to 19 May 2019. Matches of the play-in were held in the VCS Studio in Ho Chi Minh City, matches of the group stage were held in the Vietnam National Convention Center in Hanoi, and playoffs took place in the Taipei Heping Basketball Gymnasium in Taipei.

G2 Esports from Europe defeated Team Liquid from North America 3–0 in the final and brought the region its first MSI championship.

Qualified teams and roster

Qualified teams 
The total number of participating regions decreased in 2019, from 14 last year to 13, due to the merger of two professional leagues, the North and the South of Latin America into a single league (LLA). The format was based on the 2017 Mid-Season Invitational.

Because of the Regional success in MSI and the World Championship in the two years prior (2017 and 2018), three teams from Europe (LEC), South Korea (LCK), and China (LPL) began in the main Group stage; two teams from North America (LCS) and Taiwan/Hong Kong/Macau (LMS) begin in the second round of the play-in stage; and the eight remaining teams begin in the first round of the play-in stage. Losing teams in the second round will play in a third final main group stage qualifying round.

Roster

Venues 
Ho Chi Minh City, Hanoi, Taipei were the three cities chosen to host the tournament.

Play-in stage

Round 1 
Only two teams of each pool is drawn into a group. Double Round Robin. First place teams from each group advance to Round 2.

Group A

Group B

Round 2 
Team Liquid plays against Group A 1st-place. Flash Wolves plays against Group B 1st-place. Winners of the series advance to Group stage. Losers will be dropped to Round 3.

Round 3 
Winner of the series advances to Group stage. Loser is eliminated.

VCS of Vietnam gets directly spot in Main Group Stage for Summer Split winner and additional spot in Play-in Stage at 2019 League of Legends World Championship.

Group stage 
Double Round Robin. Top 4 teams advance to the knock-out stage. Bottom 2 teams are eliminated.

China, South Korea, Europe and North America get pool 1 in Main Group Stage at 2019 League of Legends World Championship for Summer Split winner. TW/HK/MO and Vietnam get pool 2.

Knockout stage 
 1st place team of Group Stage chooses between 3rd and 4th place to be their semifinal opponent (IG chose TL).
 Single elimination, matches are best-of-five

Semifinals

Match 1 

 Date and time: 17 May, 11:00 UTC.

Match 2 

 Date and time: 18 May, 08:00 UTC.

Finals 

 Date and time: 19 May, 08:00 UTC
 The members of the winning team will lift the MSI trophy, earning their title as the League of Legends 2019 Mid-Season Invitational Champions.

Ranking 
(*) Not including tie-break games.

References 

2019 in esports
2019 multiplayer online battle arena tournaments
2019